Carry On My Way is Japanese J-pop girlband Speed's third and final album following their first album, Starting Over, and their second album, Rise. This album was released on December 22, 1999. It contains hit singles such as "Precious Time", "Breakin' Out to the Morning" and "Long Way Home". The album sold 1.5 million copies and successfully hit the top position of the Oricon chart in the first week of the millennium (2000).

Track listing
"Carry On My Way"
"" — (Blue Regret)
"Long Way Home (Album Edit)"
"Deep Blue & Truth"
"Luv Blanket"
"Breakin' Out to the Morning"
"Snow Kiss"
"You Are the Moonlight"
"Lookin' for Love"
"Precious Time"
"Two of Us"
"Eternity"
"Confusion"
"Don't Be Afraid"

Speed (Japanese band) albums
1999 albums